The Nigerian Association of Law Teachers, abbreviated as NALT is a professional body which represents the interests of law teachers in Nigeria. It was established in 1961 to promote excellence in research and legal academic teaching in Nigeria.
It aids in promoting government policies and practices related to legal education and research.
The association also helps in Legal research, Law reform, curriculum advancement of pedagogical improvements in view of national and international developments.

The incumbent president of the association is professor Smaranda Olarinde, the Provost of the College of Law, Afe Babalola University.

References

Professional associations based in Nigeria
1961 establishments in Nigeria
Organizations established in 1961
Educational organizations based in Nigeria